Apiletria is a moth genus in the family Autostichidae.

Species
 Apiletria apaurta Gozmány, 1965
 Apiletria asirica Gozmány, 1982
 Apiletria artaxerxes Gozmány, 1965
 Apiletria luella Lederer, 1855
 Apiletria marcida (Felder)
 Apiletria nervosa (Stainton, 1867)
 Apiletria purulentella (Stainton, 1867)
 Apiletria tripleura (Meyrick, 1914)

References

 
Symmocinae